Suman Sharma is a former Indian basketball player. She received the Arjuna Award in 1983 in basketball for her achievements in the field of sports. She was the first woman Arjuna awardee in basketball. Sharma is the first vice chairman of the Indian Basketball Players Association.

References

1958 births
Living people
People from Punjab, India
Recipients of the Arjuna Award